Dub is a subgenre of reggae which developed in the late 1960s and early 1970s.

This is a list of notable dub musicians, singers and producers.

0–9
10 Foot Ganja Plant
340ml

A

The Aggrovators
Augustus Clarke
Augustus Pablo
Audio Active
Alpha & Omega
Asian Dub Foundation
African Head Charge
Aswad
Alborosie
Adrian Sherwood

B

Banco de Gaia
Basque Dub Foundation
Beats Antique
Beats International
Bedouin Soundclash
Bim Sherman
The Black Seeds
Blind Idiot God
Boom One Records
Burning Spear
Bush Chemists
Dennis Bovell
Glen Brown
Black Uhuru

C
Chuck Fenda
The Clash

D

Dale and the ZDubs
Dan-I
Darkwood Dub
De Facto
Digital Mystikz
Dirty Heads
The Disciples
Doctah X
Doof
The Drastics
Dreadzone
Dry & Heavy
Dub FX
Dub Incorporation
Dub Pistols
Dub Trio
Dub Syndicate
Dubioza Kolektiv
Dubtribe

E
Easy Star All-Stars
The Expendables

F
Fat Freddy's Drop
Fishmans
The Flying Lizards
Free Moral Agents

G
Gaudi
Gentleman's Dub Club
Godflesh  
Grace Jones
Groundation
Giant Panda Guerilla Dub Squad

H

Derrick Harriott
High Tone
Keith Hudson
Horace Andy

I
illScarlett
International Observer
Iration
Israel Vibration

J

Jah Shaka
Jah Wobble
Joe Gibbs (producer)
Linton Kwesi Johnson
Junior Reid

K
Katchafire
King Jammy
King Midas Sound
King Tubby
King Shiloh

L

Bill Laswell
Bunny Lee
Leftfield
Liondub
Don Letts
Long Beach Dub Allstars
Lucky Dube

M

Mad Professor
Mark Stewart
Massive Attack
Matisyahu
Meat Beat Manifesto
Mikey Dread
Mungo's Hi Fi
Moa Anbessa
Moonlight Dub Experiment
More Rockers
Mute Beat

N
Niney the Observer
Natty Nation

O
OKI
Ott
The Orb
Ooklah The Moc

P
Pepper
Pitch Black
Prince Far I
Prince Jammy
Lee "Scratch" Perry

R
Rebelution
Rhythm & Sound
Johnny Ringo
Roots Radics
Roots Tonic
Rhombus

S
Saafi Brothers
The Sabres of Paradise
Salmonella Dub
Santigold
Satori
Scientist
Skream
The Slackers
Slightly Stoopid
Sly & Robbie
Smith & Mighty
Sneaker Pimps
Sofa Surfers
Soldiers of Jah Army
Sounds from the Ground
Spacemonkeyz
Stand High Patrol
Steel Pulse
Stick Figure
Subatomic Sound System
Sublime

T

Tackhead
Tapper Zukie
Thievery Corporation
Linval Thompson
Ticklah
The Toasters
Tosca
Trentemøller
Tropidelic
Twilight Circus
Twinkle Brothers

U
The Upsetters
UB40

V
Vibronics
Victor Axelrod
Victor Rice
Vladislav Delay

W
White Mice

Y
Yabby You

Z
Zion Train

Lists of musicians by genre